Sirkanay District (Sarkani District) is situated in the central part of Kunar Province, Afghanistan. It borders Pakistan to the south. The population is 39,292 (2019). The district administrative center is the village of Serkanay at 775 m altitude. To the north the district borders the Kunar River, which irrigates the small part of arable land. Drought is the major problem of the people. The majority of the houses (70%) were destroyed during the wars. Many young men live and work in Pakistan.

Ethnic background: Nearly all population of Serkanay District are pashtun people with a small number of gujars. Alakozais  are the dominant tribe of the district who live in the central part of the district. Other tribes are Mamoond, Momand, Safi and Salarzais.

Villages of Sarkani District
 
Sarkano
Pashad
Donai
Nawa
Ganjgal
Barogai
Barabad
Tango 
Shonkray
Bila

See also
Districts of Afghanistan

References

External links
AIMS District Map
District Profile

Districts of Kunar Province